Erthesina fullo, commonly known as the yellow-spotted stink bug or yellow marmorated stink bug, is a species of stink bug in the family Pentatomidae. It is found in east and southeast Asia. It is one of the most widely distributed phytophagous insect pests in Asia, and feeds on dozens of host plants including a number of economically important fruits, such as apples, cherries, pears, and kiwifruit.

References

External links

 

Shield bugs
Insects described in 1783